Cable and Wireless Sports Club Ground is a cricket ground in Bridgetown, Barbados.

History
The ground was established for the employees of Barbados External Telecommunications (BET), which later became Cable & Wireless and LIME. The ground has predominantly been used in club cricket by LIME Sports Club. It played host to three List A one-day matches in the 2005–06 KFC Cup, with Barbados featuring in only one of the matches. The matches were all low scoring affairs.

Records

List A
Highest team total: 220 all out (48.4 overs) by Barbados v Windward Islands, 2005–06
Lowest team total:101 all out (19.5 overs) by Trinidad and Tobago v Jamaica, 2005–06
Highest individual innings: 71 by Dale Richards for Barbados v Windward Islands, 2005–06
Best bowling in an innings: 3-17 by David Bernard for Jamaica v Trinidad and Tobago, 2005–06

See also
List of cricket grounds in the West Indies

References

External links
Cable and Wireless Sports Club Ground at ESPNcricinfo

Cricket grounds in Barbados